Velká Amerika (literally "Big America") is a partly flooded, abandoned limestone quarry in the Mořina municipality in the Central Bohemian Region of the Czech Republic.

Description
It is nicknamed "Czech Grand Canyon".

There are other smaller quarries west of Velká Amerika, including Malá Amerika (Small America), Mexiko and Kanada. The quarries are connected with each other by long tunnels.

History
Mining of the limestone was conducted in the first half of the 20th century. Political prisoners were used to work here, to which a memorial is dedicated here.

Tourism
The quarry is popular stop for tourists. There are several lookout points. It is sought after by professional divers, but due to the risk of injury, entry into the quarry is permanently forbidden.

In popular culture
The place has several times been used by Czech filmmakers, notably in Lemonade Joe and Accumulator 1.

References

Tourist attractions in the Central Bohemian Region